Jacinta Monroe (born September 4, 1988) is an American professional women's basketball player in the Women's National Basketball Association (WNBA).

Career
Monroe attended Stranahan High School in Fort Lauderdale, Florida, where she was the 2006 Gatorade Florida Girls' Basketball Player of the Year. She attended Florida State University. In the WNBA, Monroe has played with the Washington Mystics and the Tulsa Shock.

Florida  State statistics

Source

USA Basketball
Monroe was named a member of the team representing the US at the 2009 World University Games held in Belgrade, Serbia. The team won all seven games to earn the gold medal. Monroe averaged 7.3 points per game

References

External links
 Player profile
 Florida State Seminoles bio

1988 births
Living people
American expatriate basketball people in China
American expatriate basketball people in Spain
American women's basketball players
Basketball players from Florida
Beijing Great Wall players
Centers (basketball)
Florida State Seminoles women's basketball players
Sportspeople from Fort Lauderdale, Florida
Tulsa Shock players
Universiade gold medalists for the United States
Universiade medalists in basketball
Washington Mystics draft picks
Washington Mystics players
Medalists at the 2009 Summer Universiade